Thota Narasaiah Naidu was an Indian freedom fighter and a resident of the Pagolu taluk, Machilipatnam (present-day Andhra Pradesh). He was a wrestler by profession and served in the court of the Challapalli Zamindar.

On 6 May 1930, there was rioting across India due to the arrest of Mahatma Gandhi for leading the Dandi March. In Machilipatnam, Naidu, along with other leaders, led a protest against this arrest.

Naidu, along with two other leaders, tried to hoist the Indian National Flag at the top of a tall pillar located at the center of the Koneru Center. To stop the protest and the flag hoist, the police started to rain severe blows on them. They lost their grip and were severely bruised; however, they continued to chant slogans. Naidu took the flag and hoisted it on top of the pillar. After 45 minutes of being beaten by the police, he collapsed from the top of the pillar and suffered severe injuries.

References 

Indian revolutionaries
Indian wrestlers
Date of birth missing
Date of death missing
People from Krishna district
Indian independence activists from Andhra Pradesh
Sportspeople from Andhra Pradesh